The Atlantic States Marine Fisheries Commission (ASMFC) is a commission of U.S. states formed to coordinate and manage fishery resources — including marine (saltwater) fish, shellfish, and anadromous fish (migratory fish that ascended rivers from the sea for spawning) - along the Atlantic coast of the United States.

The Commission was formed by the 15 Atlantic coast states in 1940 and chartered by the United States Congress in 1942 in recognition that "fish do not adhere to political boundaries."
The Commission serves as a deliberative body, coordinating the conservation and management of the states shared near-shore fishery resources – marine, shell, and anadromous – for sustainable use.

Member states are (in order of north to south) Maine, New Hampshire, Massachusetts, Rhode Island, Connecticut, New York, New Jersey, Pennsylvania, Delaware, Maryland, Virginia, North Carolina, South Carolina, Georgia, and Florida. Each member state is represented by three Commissioners: the director for the state's marine fisheries management agency, a member of the state legislature, and an individual appointed by the governor. Commissioners participate in the deliberations in the Commission's five main policy arenas: Interstate fisheries management, research and statistics, fisheries science, habitat conservation, and law enforcement. The one-state one-vote concept allows Commissioners to address stakeholder-resource balance issues at the state level.

"The Commission focuses on responsible stewardship of marine fisheries resources. It serves as a forum for the states to collectively address fisheries issues under the premise that as a group, using a cooperative approach, they can achieve more than they could as individuals. The Commission does not promote a particular state or a particular stakeholder sector."

ASMFC managed species 

Currently the ASMFC manages 27 species.
These species include:

 American eel
 American lobster
 Atlantic croaker
 Atlantic herring
 Atlantic menhaden
 Atlantic sturgeon
 Black Drum
 Black sea bass
 Bluefish
 Coastal sharks
 Cobia
 Horseshoe crab
 Jonah crab
 Northern shrimp
 Red drum
 Scup
 Shad & river herring
 Spanish mackerel
 Spiny dogfish
 Spot croaker
 Spotted seatrout
 Striped bass
 Summer flounder
 Tautog
 Weakfish
 Winter flounder

References

External links 
 

United States interstate agencies
United States interstate compacts
Fishing areas of the Atlantic Ocean
1942 establishments in the United States
Legal history of Maine
Legal history of New Hampshire
Legal history of Massachusetts
Legal history of Rhode Island
Legal history of Connecticut
Legal history of New York (state)
Legal history of New Jersey
Legal history of Pennsylvania
Legal history of Delaware
Legal history of Maryland
Legal history of Virginia
Legal history of North Carolina
Legal history of South Carolina
Legal history of Georgia (U.S. state)
Legal history of Florida